Murder Mestri (Marathi: मर्डर मेस्त्री) is a 2015 Marathi film directed by Rahul Jadhav. Starring Vandana Gupte, Dilip Prabhavalkar, Kranti Redkar, Sanjay Khapre, Manasi Naik, Vikas Kadam, and Hrishikesh Joshi. The movie was released on 10 July 2015.

Plot
Prabhakar, a postman by profession lives with his family in a village in Konkan. The most important in Prabhakar's life is his adorable daughter Pari.
Prabhakar is a simple person with no dreams but a weird nature. He is very honest with his duty but has got a strange habit.  This strange habit of him not only creates chaos in his & others life but also puts their lives in danger.
Will  Prabhakar manage to rectify his mistake or people will have to sacrifice their lives for his mistake.
That you need to check in the theaters. Come Enjoy the mystery.

Cast
 Vandana Gupte as Mrs. Malini
 Dilip Prabhavalkar as Doctor
 Kranti Redkar as Saraswati
 Sanjay Khapare as Sarpanch
 Manasi Naik as Hemlata
 Vikas Kadam as Madhav
 Hrishikesh Joshi as Prabhakar
 Kamlakar Satpute as Janardan

Soundtrack

The soundtrack of Murder Mestri consists of 3 songs composed by Pankaj Padghan.

Critical reception

Prasanna D Zore of Rediff gave the film a rating of 4 out of 5 saying that, "The comedy is clean, simple, silly. Yet, you long for more. And it does keep coming." Keyur Seta of Marathi Stars gave the film a rating of 2.5 out of 5 saying that, "Murder Mestri is an average, one-time watch comedy."

References

External links
 

 
 

2015 films
2010s Marathi-language films